Merchant International Group (MIG) was a privately owned British strategic research and corporate intelligence company with offices in London, Hong Kong and Vienna.

History
Merchant International Group was established in 1982 by Stuart Poole-Robb and Alan Bailey who had both previously served in the UK military. Peter Davies, a former Morgan Grenfell and Deutsche Bank banker served as the companies chairman from 2002. The group had an advisory board made up of a number of prominent former public servants including Sir Graham Boyce the former ambassador to Kuwait, and Baroness Chalker of Wallasey. Sir John Wheeler, the former Conservative politician who served as Northern Ireland security minister, served as a non-executive director.

Services
The company worked for a number of UK based multinationals including Cadbury Schweppes, Legal & General, and Kingfisher plc. The company worked with over half the FTSE 100 and 150 of the Fortune 500. MIG also provided global risk research to the World Bank. MIG developed a framework that identified ten categories of Grey Area Dynamics™. Each refers to a range of events, activities and trends that impact upon business. 
 
It provided data to Transparency International alongside the Asia Development Bank, World Economic Forum, and Economist Intelligence Unit to compile its Corruption Perceptions Index (CPI).
 
MIG produced the Marine Piracy Threat Assessment which modelled piracy risks in various parts of the world and was featured each month in the shipping journal Lloyd's List. The reports were some of the first to highlight the statistical increase in global piracy and as a result drew criticism from some parts of the shipping industry for damaging the reputation of some countries and pushing up the cost of insuring vessels entering piracy zones.

Awards
Merchant International Group won the European Service Provider of the Year, 1999-2000 at the European Risk Management Awards magazine International Risk Management. In 2004, the company won an award for Product of the Year from StrategicRisk.

Similar companies
 Carratu International Plc UK
 International Intelligence Limited UK & US
 Control Risks Group UK
 Hakluyt & Company
 Kroll

References

Security consulting firms
Political risk consulting firms
Private detectives and investigators
Risk management companies
Consulting firms established in 1982
1982 establishments in the United Kingdom